"The Opera" is the 49th episode of the sitcom Seinfeld. It is the ninth episode of the fourth season. It aired on November 4, 1992. This episode deals with the characters attending a production of Pagliacci. The characters' lives begin to imitate the opera when Elaine's increasingly unstable boyfriend "Crazy" Joe Davola thinks she is cheating on him and stalks her and Jerry while dressed in a clown costume.

Plot
Elaine's boyfriend, "Crazy" Joe Davola, leaves Jerry a threatening phone message. Kramer has tickets for the opera Pagliacci, and everyone is going, including Elaine and Joe. Elaine drops in on Joe's apartment where she discovers that he has a wall of pictures of her that he secretly took with his telephoto lens. Terrified, she attempts to leave the apartment. When Joe tries to stop her, insinuating that she is cheating on him, she maces him with cherry Binaca and flees.

Jerry, Kramer, Elaine, and George go to the opera, where Elaine tells the others that Joe is not coming, and Susan has to pick up a friend at the airport and cannot come either, so they have two extra tickets. George and Kramer attempt to scalp the tickets, working separately after Kramer refuses to sell for anything less than an absurdly high price. As Jerry and Elaine wait for them to return, they are asked by a street performer impersonating Canio for tips. Jerry had flipped a coin earlier, and it was taken by another spectator, so he does not have any money for the clown, which annoys him.

Joe, in full Pagliaccio costume, walks through a park on his way to the opera house. He is antagonized by a group of hoodlums, but uses martial arts to knock them all out. He approaches Kramer and intimidates him with his manner, particularly as Kramer is scared of clowns.

Jerry and Elaine get to talking about "their nutjob" friends, and discover that each of their Joes is the same person. Joe accosts them in clown costume, and they run away.

George finally agrees to sell the ticket to someone. Susan runs up and says she can join him because her friend's plane was diverted to Philadelphia. George gives her ticket to her, and gives the buyer his own.

Kramer shows up with the tickets, and he, Elaine and Jerry take their seats. They are joined by Susan and Harry Fong, the man to whom George sold his ticket. They ask where George is; Susan tells them that he was "uncomfortable." Jerry and Elaine ask Kramer to whom he gave the last ticket. As the curtain comes up, Kramer answers, "Some nut in a clown suit." Jerry and Elaine look horrified as the audience applauds.

Production
The scene when Jerry and another audience member start arguing and tearing dollar bills is a reference to a similar scene in the film Broadway Danny Rose.

References

External links 
 

Seinfeld (season 4) episodes
1992 American television episodes